The 2012 Dutch Open Grand Prix was the twelfth grand prix gold and grand prix tournament of the 2012 BWF Grand Prix Gold and Grand Prix. The tournament was held in Topsportcentrum, Almere, Netherlands October 9 until October 14, 2012 and had a total purse of $50,000.

Men's singles

Seeds

  Przemyslaw Wacha (third round)
  Ville Lang (first round)
  Dmytro Zavadsky (quarter-final)
  Andre Kurniawan Tedjono (quarter-final)
  Yuhan Tan (third round)
  Anand Pawar (withdrew)
  Eric Pang (champion)
  Dicky Palyama (final)
  Dieter Domke (semi-final)
  Scott Evans (quarter-final)
  Vladimir Malkov (withdrew)
  Rasmus Fladberg (first round)
  Emil Holst (semi-final)
  Petr Koukal (third round)
  Christian Lind Thomsen (quarter-final)
  Rune Ulsing (third round)

Finals

Top half

Section 1

Section 2

Section 3

Section 4

Bottom half

Section 5

Section 6

Section 7

Section 8

Women's singles

Seeds

  Yao Jie (second round)
  Linda Zechiri (second round)
  Kristina Gavnholt (champion)
  Michelle Chan Ky (second round)
  Salakjit Ponsana (withdrew)
  Chloe Magee (quarter-final)
  Sashina Vignes Waran (withdrew)
  Karina Jørgensen (quarter-final)

Finals

Top half

Section 1

Section 2

Bottom half

Section 3

Section 4

Men's doubles

Seeds

  Lukasz Moren / Wojciech Szkudlarczyk (semi-final)
  Christian John Skovgaard / Mads Pieler Kolding (withdrew)
  Jorrit de Ruiter / Dave Khodabux (second round)
  Ronan Labar / Mathias Quere (withdrew)

Finals

Top half

Section 1

Section 2

Bottom half

Section 3

Section 4

Women's doubles

Seeds

  Emma Wengberg / Emelie Lennartsson (quarter-final)
  Pia Zebadiah / Rizki Amelia Pradipta (quarter-final)
  Selena Piek / Iris Tabeling (champion)
  Steffi Annys / Severine Corvilain (second round)

Finals

Top half

Section 1

Section 2

Bottom half

Section 3

Section 4

Mixed doubles

Seeds

  Anthony Dumartheray / Sabrina Jaquet (semi-final)
  Baptiste Careme / Audrey Fontaine (second round)
  Wojciech Szkudlarczyk / Agnieszka Wojtkowska (quarter-final)
  Ronan Labar / Laura Choinet (first round)
  Mads Pieler Kolding / Kamilla Rytter Juhl (champion)
  Marcus Ellis / Gabrielle White (final)
  Markis Kido / Pia Zebadiah (semi-final)
  Dave Khodabux / Selena Piek (second round)

Finals

Top half

Section 1

Section 2

Bottom half

Section 3

Section 4

References

2012 Dutch Open Grand Prix
Dutch Open Grand Prix
Dutch Open
BWF Grand Prix Gold and Grand Prix
Sports competitions in Almere